The Houston Harte University Center serves the recreational and community needs of students at Angelo State University in San Angelo, Texas, U.S. The center was named for Houston Harte, founder of the Harte-Hanks media company and a contributor to the university. It measures over 110,000 sq. ft. making it one of the larger student centers in the country.

The center houses the Student Life Office, the Center for Student Involvement, the campus bookstore, Student Senate offices, the C.J. Davidson Conference Center and the Student Credit Union. For student recreation, it offers multiple pool tables, ping pong tables, air hockey tables, as well as multiple large flat screen plasma televisions equipped with Xbox 360 game consoles and a 12-foot projection screen for student use. In addition to the Main University Food Center the University Center snack bar features pizza, Chinese cuisine, breakfast burritos, and American grill food stands, as well as Starbucks, Chick-fil-A, and Blimpie Subs and Salads.

References

External links
 Angelo State University's Houston Harte Student Center

Angelo State University
Student activity centers in the United States
Buildings and structures in San Angelo, Texas